Henry of Burgundy may refer to:
Henry I, Duke of Burgundy (946–1002), sometimes called Eudes Henry or Odo Henry
Henry I of France (1008–1060), also held Burgundy as Henry II
Henry, son of Robert I of Burgundy (1035–1074), son and heir of Robert I, Duke of Burgundy, but died during his father's lifetime; father of two Dukes of Burgundy, and of:
Henry, Count of Portugal (1066–1112), son of Henry of Burgundy